Through the Neighbor's Window is a 1913 American silent short comedy film directed by Edward Coxen starring Charlotte Burton, Edith Borella, Jean Durrell, Robert Grey and Billie West.

External links

1913 films
1913 comedy films
Silent American comedy films
American silent short films
American black-and-white films
1913 short films
American comedy short films
1910s American films